The Metropolitan Borough of Wirral is a metropolitan borough of Merseyside, in North West England. It has a population of 321,238, and encompasses  of the northern part of the Wirral Peninsula. Major settlements include Birkenhead, Wallasey, Bebington, Heswall, Hoylake and West Kirby. The city of Liverpool faces the northeastern side of Wirral over the Mersey.

Geography

Bordering is the River Mersey to the east, the Irish Sea to the north and the River Dee to the west; the borough of Cheshire West and Chester occupies the remainder of the Wirral Peninsula and borders the borough of Wirral to the south. The borough of Wirral has greater proportions of rural areas than the Liverpool part of Merseyside.

History 
The borough was formed on 1 April 1974, under the Local Government Act 1972, as a merger of the county boroughs of Birkenhead and Wallasey, along with the municipal borough of Bebington and the urban districts of Hoylake and Wirral.

Economy
This is a chart of trend of regional gross value added of Wirral at current basic prices published (pp. 240–253) by Office for National Statistics with figures in millions of British Pounds Sterling.

 includes hunting and forestry

 includes energy and construction

 includes financial intermediation services indirectly measured

 Components may not sum to totals due to rounding

Plans were announced in 2006 for a  £4.5bn development around the docklands to be called Wirral Waters. The development is a mixture of industrial, office, residential and leisure facilities. Planning permission was granted in 2010 and work began on the site in 2011, with development work potentially lasting for 30 years.

Education 

When the borough was set up in 1974, it inherited comprehensive systems from the former County Boroughs of Birkenhead and Wallasey. In the part of Wirral formerly administered by Cheshire County Council, it inherited a selective system of grammar and secondary modern non-Roman Catholic schools and a comprehensive Roman Catholic school (St John Plessington Catholic College).

Until the implementation of the Education Reform Act 1988, education in Wirral continued to be organised in four areas; Birkenhead, Wallasey and the former parts of Cheshire known for education purposes as "Bebington" and "Deeside". However this Act introduced "open enrolment", allowing parents from anywhere in the borough, and outside it, to apply for a place for their child at any secondary school. As a result, significant numbers of pupils from the former "comprehensive areas" attend schools in the former "selective areas" and vice versa. The distinction between different types of school was to an extent masked, as all secondary modern and most comprehensive schools were named "High School". As a further result of this Act, St Anselm's College and Upton Hall School, both within the Birkenhead education area, became the only independent schools in the country to become state funded grant-maintained schools, retaining selective admissions policies to become Roman Catholic grammar schools.

A further change came as a result of the School Standards and Framework Act 1998, which effectively changed secondary modern schools into comprehensives as schools were no longer permitted to select by examination failure. In summary, Wirral now has a state secondary sector made up of 16 comprehensive schools (of which two are Roman Catholic) and 6 grammar schools (of which two are Roman Catholic).

Local government

Liverpool City Region Combined Authority

The Metropolitan Borough of Wirral is one of the six constituent local government districts of the Liverpool City Region. Since 1 April 2014, some of the borough's responsibilities have been pooled with neighbouring authorities within the metropolitan area and subsumed into the Liverpool City Region Combined Authority.

The combined authority has effectively become the top-tier administrative body for the local governance of the city region and the leader of Wirral Borough Council, along with the five other leaders from neighbouring local government districts, take strategic decisions over economic development, transport, employment and skills, tourism, culture, housing and physical infrastructure.

As of July 2015, negotiations are currently taking place between the UK national government and the combined authority over a possible devolution deal to confer greater powers on the region. Discussions include whether to introduce an elected 'Metro Mayor' to oversee the entire metropolitan area.

Wirral Borough Council Composition

After the local elections in 2008 the Metropolitan Borough of Wirral was governed by a Labour Party/Liberal Democrat coalition, the second and third largest parties on the council respectively. Steve Foulkes of Labour was leader of the council. The Conservative Party was the largest party represented, and was in opposition with its leader Jeff Green being leader of the opposition.

After the local elections in 2010 the Metropolitan Borough of Wirral was governed by a Conservative Party/Liberal Democrat coalition, which reflected the coalition at national level. The Conservative Party, continuing to be the largest party represented on the council increased its number of seats by 2 to 27 and has now entered into coalition government with the Liberal Democrats as the leading coalition partner with the leader of the Conservatives, Jeff Green, becoming the new leader of the council. The Labour Party increased its representation on the council by 4 to 24 and remained the second largest party though they are now in opposition with their leader, Steve Foulkes, who was leader of the council now leader of the opposition. The Liberal Democrats lost 4 seats decreasing their tally to 15 remaining the third largest party on the council but continuing to participate in the governing of the council as the junior coalition partner to the Conservatives. The one independent represented on the council lost their seat.

After the local elections in 2011 the Metropolitan Borough of Wirral was governed by a minority Labour Party administration. Foulkes was leader of the council with Phil Davies as deputy leader. The Liberal Democrats lost a councillor who switched to Labour, Steve Niblock shortly after the elections. There are now no independents on Wirral Council. Labour have 36 seats, Conservatives have 23 and the Liberal Democrats 7.

In February 2012 the Conservatives and Liberal Democrats defeated the Labour administration in a motion of no confidence and the two parties governed again until the May election. Labour made gains in May 2012, gaining majority control of the council for the first time since local elections in 2002 saw Labour become a minority. Wirral is led by Phil Davies.

In 2014, The Green Party gained their first seat on the council, defeating Labour in their typically safe seat of Birkenhead and Tranmere. They retained it in 2018 with an increased vote share, albeit with a reduced majority.

Political makeup

Members of Parliament

Places of interest
Wirral Council maintains five designated Local Nature Reserves: Bidston Moss, Dibbinsdale, Heswall Dales, Hilbre Island and Thurstaston Common. It also operates the Merseyside part of Wirral Country Park, which was the first country park to be established in Britain.

International relations

Twin towns – sister cities
The Metropolitan Borough of Wirral is twinned or has sister city relationships with:
 Lorient, France
 Gennevilliers, France
 Midland, Texas, United States
 Reno, Nevada, United States

Freedom of the Borough
The following People, Military Units and Organisations and Groups have received the Freedom of the Borough of Wirral.

Individuals
 Lieutenant Commander Ian Edward Fraser: 1993.
 Joseph Lynch: 1996.
 Raymond Holmes: 2005.
 The Right Reverend David Urquhart: 2006.
 Rt Hon Lord Chan of Oxton: 2006.
 Stephen Maddox: 2010.
 Police Constable David Phillips: 21 May 2016.
 Rt Hon Lord Field of Birkenhead: 16 February 2022.

Military Units
 The Cheshire Regiment: 1996.
 The Royal Marines: 1998.
 1st Battalion The Mercian Regiment: 2009. 
 234 (Wirral) Transport Squadron, RLC (Volunteers): 18 February 2012.
 107 (Lancashire and Cheshire) Field Squadron (Volunteers): 18 February 2012.

 , RN: 6 July 2015.
 Wallasey Sea Cadet Corps: 6 July 2015.

Organisations and Groups
 The 96 people killed at the Hillsborough disaster: 15 September 2017.
 Andrew Devine (97th Hillsborough Victim): 21 March 2021.

References

External links

Metropolitan Borough of Wirral home page
Vision of Britain
Wirral Archives Service

 
Metropolitan boroughs of Merseyside
Liverpool City Region
NUTS 3 statistical regions of the United Kingdom